Neil Leslie Diamond (born January 24, 1941) is an American singer-songwriter. He has sold more than 130 million records worldwide, making him one of the best-selling musicians of all time. He has had ten No. 1 singles on the U.S. Billboard Hot 100 and Adult Contemporary charts: "Cracklin' Rosie", "Song Sung Blue", "Longfellow Serenade", "I've Been This Way Before", "If You Know What I Mean", "Desirée", "You Don't Bring Me Flowers", "America", "Yesterday's Songs", and "Heartlight". Thirty-eight songs by Diamond have reached the top 10 on the Billboard Adult Contemporary charts, including "Sweet Caroline". He has also acted in films, making his screen debut in the 1980 musical drama film The Jazz Singer.

Diamond was inducted into the Songwriters Hall of Fame in 1984 and into the Rock and Roll Hall of Fame in 2011, and he received the Sammy Cahn Lifetime Achievement Award in 2000. In 2011, he was an honoree at the Kennedy Center Honors, and he received the Grammy Lifetime Achievement Award in 2018.

Early life and education
Diamond was born in Brooklyn, New York City, to a Jewish family. All four of his grandparents were immigrants, from Poland on his father's side and Russia on his mother's. His parents were Rose (née Rapoport; 1918–2019) and Akeeba "Kieve" Diamond (1917–1985), a dry-goods merchant. He grew up in several homes in Brooklyn, having also spent four years in Cheyenne, Wyoming, where his father was stationed in the army. In Brooklyn, he attended Erasmus Hall High School and was a member of the Freshman Chorus and Choral Club, along with classmate Barbra Streisand; Diamond recalled they were not close friends at the time: "We were two poor kids in Brooklyn. We hung out in the front of Erasmus High and smoked cigarettes." Also in their class was chess grandmaster Bobby Fischer. After his family moved to Brighton Beach, he attended Abraham Lincoln High School and was a member of the fencing team. Also on the team was his best friend, future Olympic fencer Herb Cohen.

For his 16th birthday, he received his first guitar. When he was 16 and still in high school, Diamond spent a number of weeks at Surprise Lake Camp, a camp for Jewish children in upstate New York, when folk singer Pete Seeger performed a small concert. Seeing the widely recognized singer perform, and watching other children singing songs for Seeger that they wrote themselves, had an immediate effect on Diamond, who then became aware of the possibility of writing his own songs. "And the next thing, I got a guitar when we got back to Brooklyn, started to take lessons and almost immediately began to write songs", he said. He added that his attraction to songwriting was the "first real interest" he had growing up, while also helping him release his youthful "frustrations".

Diamond also used his newly developed skill to write poetry. By writing poems for girls he was attracted to in school, he soon learned it often won their hearts. His male classmates took note and began asking him to write poems for them, which they would sing and use with equal success. He spent the summer following his graduation as a waiter in the Catskills resort area. There he first met Jaye Posner, who would years later become his wife.

Diamond next attended New York University as a pre-med major on a fencing scholarship, again on the fencing team with Herb Cohen. He was a member of the 1960 NCAA men's championship fencing team. Often bored in class, he found writing song lyrics more to his liking. He began cutting classes and taking the train up to Tin Pan Alley, where he tried to get some of his songs heard by local music publishers. In his senior year, when he was just 10 units short of graduation, Sunbeam Music Publishing offered him a 16-week job writing songs for $50 a week (equivalent to about $ per week, in ), and he dropped out of college to accept it.

Career

1960s
Diamond was not rehired after his 16 weeks with Sunbeam, and he began writing and singing his own songs for demos. "I never really chose songwriting", he says. "It just absorbed me and became more and more important in my life." His first recording contract was billed as "Neil and Jack", an Everly Brothers-type duet with high school friend Jack Packer. They recorded the unsuccessful singles "You Are My Love at Last" with "What Will I Do", and "I'm Afraid" with "Till You've Tried Love", both records released in 1962. Cashbox and Billboard magazines gave all four sides positive reviews, and Diamond signed with Columbia Records as a solo performer later in 1962. In July 1963, Columbia released the single "At Night" with "Clown Town"; Billboard gave a laudatory review to "Clown Town", and Cashbox was complimentary to both sides, but it still failed to make the charts. Columbia dropped him from their label and he went back to writing songs in and out of publishing houses for the next seven years.

He wrote wherever he could, including on buses, and used an upright piano above the Birdland Club in New York City. One of the causes of this early nomadic life as a songwriter was his songs' wordiness: "I'd spent a lot of time on lyrics, and they were looking for hooks, and I didn't really understand the nature of that", he says. He was able to sell only about one song a week during those years, barely enough to survive. He found himself only earning enough to spend 35 cents a day on food (equivalent to $ in ). But the privacy that he had above the Birdland Club allowed him to focus on writing without distractions. "Something new began to happen. I wasn't under the gun, and suddenly interesting songs began to happen, songs that had things none of the others did." Among them were "Cherry, Cherry" and "Solitary Man". "Solitary Man" was the first record that Diamond recorded under his own name which made the charts. It remains one of his personal favorites, as it was about his early years as a songwriter, even though he failed to realize it at the time. He describes the song as "an outgrowth of my despair".

Diamond spent his early career in the Brill Building. His first success as a songwriter came in November 1965 with "Sunday and Me", a Top 20 hit for Jay and the Americans. Greater success followed with "I'm a Believer", "A Little Bit Me, a Little Bit You", "Look Out (Here Comes Tomorrow)", and "Love to Love", all performed by the Monkees. He wrote and recorded the songs for himself, but the cover versions were released before his own. The unintended consequence was that Diamond began to gain fame as a songwriter. "I'm a Believer" became a gold record within two days of its release and stayed at the top of the charts for seven weeks, making it the Popular Music Song of the Year in 1966.

"And the Grass Won't Pay No Mind" brought covers from Elvis Presley (who also interpreted "Sweet Caroline") and Mark Lindsay, former lead singer for Paul Revere & the Raiders. Other notable artists who recorded his early songs were Lulu, Cliff Richard and the English hard-rock band Deep Purple.

In 1966, Diamond signed a deal with Bert Berns's Bang Records, then a subsidiary of Atlantic. His first release on that label was "Solitary Man", which was his first true hit as a solo artist. Diamond followed with "Cherry, Cherry" and "Kentucky Woman". His early concerts featured him opening for bands such as Herman's Hermits and the Who. As a guest performer with The Who, he was shocked to see Pete Townshend swinging his guitar like a club and then throwing it against walls and off the stage until the instrument's neck broke.

Diamond began to feel restricted by Bang Records because he wanted to record more ambitious, introspective music, such as "Brooklyn Roads" from 1968. Berns wanted to release "Kentucky Woman" as a single, but Diamond was no longer satisfied writing simple pop songs, so he proposed "Shilo", which was not about the Civil War but rather an imaginary childhood friend. Bang believed that the song was not commercial enough, so it was relegated to being an LP track on Just for You. Diamond was also dissatisfied with his royalties and tried to sign with another record label after discovering a loophole in his contract that did not bind him exclusively to either WEB IV or Tallyrand, but the result was a series of lawsuits that coincided with a slump in his record sales and professional success. A magistrate refused WEB IV's request for a temporary injunction to prevent Diamond from joining another record company while his contract dispute continued in court, but the lawsuits persisted until February 1977, when he triumphed in court and purchased the rights to his Bang-era master tapes.

In March 1968, Diamond signed a deal with Uni Records; the label was named after Universal Pictures, the owner of which, MCA Inc., later consolidated its labels into MCA Records (now called Universal Music after merging with PolyGram in 1999). His debut album for Uni/MCA was Velvet Gloves and Spit, produced by Tom Catalano, which did not chart, and he recorded the follow-up Brother Love's Traveling Salvation Show at American Sound Studios in Memphis with Tommy Cogbill and Chips Moman producing.

1970s
In late 1969, Diamond moved to Los Angeles. His sound mellowed with such songs as "Sweet Caroline" (1969), "Holly Holy" (1969), "Cracklin' Rosie" (1970) and "Song Sung Blue" (1972), the last two reaching No. 1 on the Hot 100. "Sweet Caroline" was Diamond's first major hit after his slump. In 2007, Diamond said he had written "Sweet Caroline" for Caroline Kennedy after seeing her on the cover of Life in an equestrian riding outfit, but in 2014 he said in an interview on the Today show that it was written for his then wife, Marcia. He could not find a good rhyme with the name "Marcia" and so used the name Caroline. It took him just one hour in a Memphis hotel to write and compose it. The 1971 release "I Am...I Said" was a Top 5 hit in both the US and UK and was his most intensely personal effort to date, taking over four months to complete.

In 1971, Diamond played seven sold-out concerts at the Greek Theater in Los Angeles. The outdoor theater, which was noted for showcasing the best of current entertainers, added a stereo sound system for the first time. Diamond was also backed by a 35-piece string orchestra and six backing singers. After the first night, one leading newspaper called it "the finest concert in Greek Theater history."

In August 1972, he played again at the Greek, this time doing ten shows. When the show was first announced, tickets at the 5000-seat theater sold out rapidly. He added a quadraphonic sound system for his performance to create full surround sound. The performance of August 24, 1972, was recorded and released as the live double album Hot August Night. Diamond recalled: "Hot August Night captures a very special show for me. We went all out to really knock 'em dead in LA." Many consider it his best work; critic Stephen Thomas Erlewine called Hot August Night "the ultimate Neil Diamond record... [showing] Diamond the icon in full glory." The album became a classic, and was remastered in 2000 with additional selections. In Australia, which at the time was said to have the most Neil Diamond fans per capita of any country, the album ranked No. 1 for 29 weeks and stayed in their top 20 bestsellers for two years.

In the fall of 1972, Diamond performed for 20 consecutive nights at the Winter Garden Theater in New York City. That theater had not staged a one-man show since Al Jolson in the 1930s. The approximately 1,600-seat Broadway venue provided an intimate concert setting not common at the time, with every performance reportedly sold out. It also made Diamond the first rock-era star to headline on Broadway. The review in The New York Times stated:

After the Winter Garden shows, Diamond announced that he needed a break, and he engaged in no live performances until 1976. He used those four years to work on the score for Hall Bartlett's film version of Richard Bach's Jonathan Livingston Seagull and to record two albums, Serenade and Beautiful Noise. He said years later, "I knew I'd come back, but I wasn't sure when. I spent one year on each of those albums...I'd been on the road six years. I had a son 2½ and I felt he needed me more than the audience did. So for four years I devoted myself to my son Jesse." He also said he needed to get back to having a private life, one where he could be anonymous.

In 1973, Diamond switched labels again, returning to Columbia Records for a million-dollar-advance-per-album contract (about $ million per album in ). His first project, released as a solo album, was the soundtrack to Jonathan Livingston Seagull. The film received hostile reviews and did poorly at the box office, and the album grossed more than the film did. Richard Bach, author of the best-selling source story, disowned the film, and he and Diamond sued Bartlett, though for differing reasons; in Bach's case, it was because he felt the film omitted too much from the original novella, whereas in Diamond's case, it was because he felt the film had butchered his score. "After 'Jonathan,'" Diamond declared, "I vowed never to get involved in a movie again unless I had complete control." Bartlett angrily responded to Diamond's lawsuit by criticizing his music as having become "too slick...and it's not as much from his heart as it used to be." Bartlett also added, "Neil is extraordinarily talented. Often his arrogance is just a cover for the lonely and insecure person underneath."

Despite the controversy surrounding the film, the soundtrack was a success, peaking at No. 2 on the Billboard albums chart. Diamond also won a Golden Globe Award for Best Original Score and a Grammy Award for Best Score Soundtrack Album for a Motion Picture. Thereafter, Diamond often included a Jonathan Livingston Seagull suite in his live performances, as he did in his 1976 Love at the Greek concert and for his show in Las Vegas that same year.

Diamond returned to live shows in 1976 with an Australian tour, "The 'Thank You Australia' Concert", which was broadcast to 36 television outlets nationwide. He also again appeared at the Greek Theater in a 1976 concert, Love at the Greek. An album and accompanying video/DVD of the show includes a version of "Song Sung Blue" with duets with Helen Reddy and Henry Winkler, a.k.a. Arthur "The Fonz" Fonzarelli of Happy Days.

He began wearing colorful beaded shirts in concert, originally so that everyone in the audience could see him without binoculars. Bill Whitten designed and made the shirts for Diamond from the 1970s until approximately 2007.

In 1974, Diamond released the album Serenade, from which "Longfellow Serenade" and "I've Been This Way Before" were issued as singles. The latter had been intended for the Jonathan Livingston Seagull score, but Diamond had completed it too late for inclusion. That same year he appeared on a TV special for Shirley Bassey and sang a duet with her.

In 1976, he released Beautiful Noise, produced by Robbie Robertson of The Band. On Thanksgiving 1976, Diamond made an appearance at The Band's farewell concert, The Last Waltz, performing "Dry Your Eyes", which he wrote jointly with Robertson, and which had appeared on Beautiful Noise. He also joined the rest of the performers onstage at the end in a rendition of Bob Dylan's "I Shall Be Released".

Diamond was paid $650,000 (about $ million in ) from the Aladdin Hotel in Las Vegas, Nevada, to open its new $10 million Theater For the Performing Arts on July 2, 1976. The show played through July 5 and drew sold-out crowds at the 7,500-seat theater. A "who's who" of Hollywood attended opening night, ranging from Elizabeth Taylor to Chevy Chase, and Diamond walked out on stage to a standing ovation. He opened the show with a story about an ex-girlfriend who dumped him before he became successful. His lead-in line to the first song of the evening was, "You may have dumped me a bit too soon, baby, because look who's standing here tonight."

He performed at Woburn Abbey on July 2, 1977, to an audience of 55,000 British fans. The concert and interviews were taped by film director William Friedkin, who used six cameras to capture the performance.

In 1977, Diamond released I'm Glad You're Here with Me Tonight, including "You Don't Bring Me Flowers", for which he composed the music and on the writing of whose lyrics he collaborated with Alan Bergman and Marilyn Bergman. Barbra Streisand covered the song on her album Songbird, and later, a Diamond-Streisand duet was recorded, spurred by the success of radio mash-ups. That version hit No. 1 in 1978, his third song to top the Hot 100. They appeared unannounced at the 1980 Grammy awards ceremony, where they performed the song to a surprised and rapturous audience.

His last 1970s album was September Morn, which included a new version of "I'm a Believer". It and "Red Red Wine" are his best-known original songs made more famous by other artists. In February 1979, the uptempo "Forever in Blue Jeans", co-written and jointly composed with his guitarist, Richard Bennett, was released as a single from You Don't Bring Me Flowers, Diamond's album from the previous year.

In 1979, Diamond collapsed on stage in San Francisco and was taken to the hospital, where he endured a 12-hour operation to remove what turned out to be a tumor on his spine. He said he had been losing feeling in his right leg "for a number of years but ignored it". When he collapsed, he had no strength in either leg. He underwent a long rehabilitation process just before starting principal photography on his film The Jazz Singer (1980). He was so convinced he was going to die that he wrote farewell letters to his friends.

1980s
A planned film version of "You Don't Bring Me Flowers" to star Diamond and Streisand fell through when Diamond instead starred in a 1980 remake of the Al Jolson classic The Jazz Singer alongside Laurence Olivier and Lucie Arnaz. Though the movie received poor reviews, the soundtrack spawned three top-10 singles, "Love on the Rocks", "Hello Again", and "America", the last of which had emotional significance for Diamond. "'America' was the story of my grandparents," he told an interviewer. "It's my gift to them, and it's very real for me ... In a way, it speaks to the immigrant in all of us." The song was performed in full by Diamond during the film's finale. An abbreviated version played over the film's opening titles.

The song was also the one he was most proud of, partly because of when it was later used: national news shows played it when the hostages were shown returning home after the Iran hostage crisis ended; it was played on the air during the 100th anniversary of the Statue of Liberty; and at a tribute to slain civil rights leader Martin Luther King Jr., as well as the Vietnam Vets Welcome Home concert, he was asked to perform it live. At the time, a national poll found the song to be the number-one most recognized song about America, more than "God Bless America". It also became the anthem of his world tour two weeks after the attacks on America on September 11, 2001, when he changed the lyric at the end from; "They're coming to America", to "Stand up for America!" Earlier that year he performed it after a request from former heavyweight champion Muhammad Ali.

The film's failure was due in part to Diamond never having acted professionally before. "I didn't think I could handle it," he said later, seeing himself as "a fish out of water". For his performance, Diamond became the first-ever winner of a Worst Actor Razzie Award, even though he was nominated for a Golden Globe Award for the same role. Critic David Wild noted that the film showed that Diamond was open about his religion: "Who else but this Jewish Elvis could go multi-platinum with an album that featured a version of 'the Kol Nidre?'" Diamond later told the Los Angeles Times, "For me, this was the ultimate bar mitzvah."

Another Top 10 selection, "Heartlight", was inspired by the blockbuster 1982 movie E.T. the Extra-Terrestrial. Though the film's title character is never mentioned in the lyrics, Universal Pictures, which had released E.T. the Extra-Terrestrial and was the parent company of the Uni Records label (by then called MCA Records), for which Diamond had recorded for years, briefly threatened legal action against both Diamond and Columbia Records.

Diamond's record sales slumped somewhat in the 1980s and 1990s, his last single to make the Billboard Pop Singles chart coming in 1986, but his concert tours continued to be big draws. Billboard magazine ranked Diamond as the most profitable solo performer of 1986. He released his 17th studio album in 1986, Headed for the Future, which reached number 20 on the Billboard 200. Three weeks later he starred in Hello Again, his first television special in nine years, performing comedy sketches and a duo medley with Carol Burnett.

In January 1987, Diamond sang the national anthem at the Super Bowl. His "America" became the theme song for the Michael Dukakis 1988 presidential campaign. That same year, British band UB40's reggae interpretation of Diamond's ballad "Red Red Wine" topped the Billboard Pop Singles chart and, like the Monkees' version of "I'm a Believer", became better known than Diamond's original version.

1990s
During the 1990s, Diamond produced six studio albums. He covered many classic songs from the movies and from famous Brill Building-era songwriters. He also released two Christmas albums, the first of which peaked at No. 8 on Billboard's Album chart. Diamond also recorded two albums of mostly new material during this period. In 1992, he performed for President George H. W. Bush's final Christmas in Washington NBC special. In 1993, Diamond opened the Mark of the Quad Cities (now the iWireless Center) with two shows on May 27 and 28 to a crowd of 27,000-plus.

The 1990s saw a resurgence in Diamond's popularity. "Sweet Caroline" became a popular sing-along at sporting events. It was used at Boston College football and basketball games. College sporting events in other states also played it, and it was even played at sports events in other countries, such as a Hong Kong Sevens rugby tournament or a soccer match in Northern Ireland. It is played at every home game of the Sydney Swans of the Australian Football League. It became the theme song of Red Sox Nation, the fans of the Boston Red Sox.

The New York Rangers also adapted it as their own and played it whenever they were winning at the end of the third period of their games. The Pittsburgh Panthers football team also played it after the third quarter of all home games, with the crowd cheering, "Let's go Pitt". The Carolina Panthers played it at the end of every home game they won. The Davidson College pep band likewise played it in the second half of every Davidson Wildcats men's basketball home game.

2000s

A more severely stripped-down-to-basics album, 12 Songs, produced by Rick Rubin, was released on November 8, 2005, in two editions: a standard 12-song release, and a special edition with two bonus tracks, including one featuring backing vocals by Brian Wilson. The album debuted at No. 4 on the Billboard chart, and received generally positive reviews; Earliwine describes the album as "inarguably Neil Diamond's best set of songs in a long, long time." 12 Songs also became noteworthy as one of the last albums to be pressed and released by Sony BMG with the Extended Copy Protection software embedded in the disc. (See the 2005 Sony BMG CD copy protection scandal.)

In 2007, Diamond was inducted into the Long Island Music Hall of Fame.

On March 19, 2008, it was announced on the television show American Idol that Diamond would be a guest mentor to the remaining Idol contestants, who would sing Diamond songs for the broadcasts of April 29 and 30, 2008. On the April 30 broadcast, Diamond premiered a new song, "Pretty Amazing Grace", from his then recently released album Home Before Dark. On May 2, 2008, Sirius Satellite Radio started Neil Diamond Radio. On April 8, 2008, Diamond made a surprise announcement in a big-screen broadcast at Fenway Park that he would be appearing there "live in concert" on August 23, 2008, as part of his world tour. The announcement, which marked the first official confirmation of any 2008 concert dates in the US, came during the traditional eighth-inning singalong of "Sweet Caroline", which had by that time become an anthem for Boston fans.

On April 28, 2008, Diamond appeared on the roof of the Jimmy Kimmel building to sing "Sweet Caroline" after Kimmel was jokingly arrested for singing the song dressed as a Diamond impersonator.

Home Before Dark was released May 6, 2008, and topped the album charts in New Zealand, the United Kingdom and the United States.

On June 29, 2008, Diamond played to an estimated 108,000 fans at the Glastonbury Festival in Somerset, England on the Concert of a Lifetime Tour; technical problems marred the concert. In August, Diamond allowed cameras to record his entire four-night run at New York's Madison Square Garden; he released the resulting DVD in the US in 2009, one year to the day of the first concert. Hot August Night/NYC debuted at No. 2 on the charts. On the same day the DVD was released, CBS aired an edited version, which won the ratings hour with 13 million viewers. The next day, the sales of the DVD surged, prompting Sony to order more copies to meet the high demand.

On August 25, 2008, Diamond performed at The Ohio State University while suffering from laryngitis. The result disappointed him as well as his fans, and on August 26, he offered refunds to anyone who applied by September 5.

Diamond was honored as the MusiCares Person of the Year on February 6, 2009, two nights before the 51st Annual Grammy Awards.

Long loved in Boston, Diamond was invited to sing at the July 4, 2009, Independence Day celebration.

On October 13, 2009, he released A Cherry Cherry Christmas, his third album of holiday music.

2010s

On November 2, 2010, Diamond released the album Dreams, a collection of 14 interpretations of his favorite songs by artists from the rock era. The album also included a new slow-tempo arrangement of his "I'm a Believer". In December, he performed a track from the album, "Ain't No Sunshine", on NBC's The Sing-Off with Committed and Street Corner Symphony, two a cappella groups featured on the show. The Very Best of Neil Diamond, a compilation CD of Diamond's 23 studio recordings from the Bang, UNI/MCA, & Columbia catalogs, was released on December 6, 2011, on the Sony Legacy label.

The years 2011 and 2012 were marked by several milestones in Diamond's career. On March 14, 2011, he was inducted into the Rock and Roll Hall of Fame at a ceremony at the Waldorf-Astoria Hotel in New York City. In December, he received a lifetime achievement award from the Kennedy Center at the 2011 Kennedy Center Honors. On August 10, 2012, Diamond received a star on the Hollywood Walk of Fame. In November 2012, he topped the bill at the centenary edition of the Royal Variety Performance in the UK, which was transmitted on December 3. He also appeared in the Macy's Thanksgiving Day Parade.

On April 20, 2013, Diamond made an unannounced appearance at Fenway Park to sing "Sweet Caroline" during the 8th inning. It was the first game at Fenway since the Boston Marathon bombing. On July 2, he released the single "Freedom Song (They'll Never Take Us Down)", with 100% of the purchase price benefiting One Fund Boston and the Wounded Warrior Project. Sporting a beard, Diamond performed live on the west lawn of the U.S. Capitol as part of A Capitol Fourth, which was broadcast nationally by PBS on July 4, 2013.

In January 2014, it was confirmed that Diamond had signed with the Capitol Music Group unit of Universal Music Group, which also owned Diamond's Uni/MCA catalog. UMG also took over Diamond's Columbia and Bang catalogues, which meant that all of his recorded output would be consolidated for the first time.

On July 8, 2014, Capitol Records announced, via a flyer included with Diamond's latest greatest hits compilations, All-Time Greatest Hits, which charted at 15 in the Billboard 200, that his next album, Melody Road, which was to be produced by Don Was and Jacknife Lee, would be released on September 30, 2014. In August, the release date was moved to October 21.

In September 2014, Diamond performed a surprise concert at his alma mater, Erasmus High School in Brooklyn. The show was announced via Twitter that afternoon. On the same day, he announced a 2015 "Melody Road" World Tour. The North American leg of the World Tour 2015 launched with a concert in Allentown, PA at the PPL Center on February 27 and ended at the Pepsi Center in Denver, Colorado on May 31, 2015. Diamond used new media platforms and social media extensively throughout the tour, streaming several shows live on Periscope and showing tweets from fans who used the hashtag #tweetcaroline on two large screens. The San Diego Union-Tribune wrote: "This, my friends, wasn't your grandfather's Neil Diamond concert. It was a multimedia extravaganza. Twitter. Periscope...It was a social media blitzkrieg that, by all accounts, proved to be an innovative way to widen his fan base."

In October 2016, Diamond released Acoustic Christmas, a folk-inspired Christmas album of original songs as well as acoustic versions of holiday classics. Produced by Was and Lee, who had produced Melody Road, the idea for the album began to take shape as the Melody Road sessions ended. To "channel the intimate atmosphere of '60s folk, Diamond recorded Acoustic Christmas with a handful of musicians, sitting around a circle of microphones, wires and, of course, Christmas lights."

In March 2017, the career-spanning anthology Neil Diamond 50 – 50th Anniversary Collection was released. He began his final concert tour, the 50 Year Anniversary World Tour in Fresno, California, in April.

In 2019, his 1969 signature song "Sweet Caroline" was selected by the Library of Congress for preservation in the National Recording Registry for being "culturally, historically, or aesthetically significant".

2020s 
On March 7, 2020, despite his retirement due to Parkinson's disease, Diamond gave a rare performance at the Keep Memory Alive Power of Love Gala at the MGM Grand Garden Arena in Las Vegas, where he was being honored.

On March 22, 2020, Diamond posted a video to YouTube playing "Sweet Caroline" with slightly modified lyrics ("...washing hands, don't touch me, I won't touch you...") in response to the widespread social distancing measures implemented due to the worldwide COVID-19 pandemic.

In April 2021, The New York Times reported that A Beautiful Noise, a musical based on Diamond's life and featuring his songs, would open at the Emerson Colonial Theater in Boston in the summer of 2022. The musical was scheduled to open on Broadway following the month-long run in Boston.

Universal Music Group acquired Diamond's songwriting catalog and the rights to his Bang Records, Columbia Records, and Capitol recordings in February 2022. The acquisition also included 110 unreleased tracks, an unreleased album and archival videos.

On June 18, 2022, Diamond sang "Sweet Caroline" during the 8th-inning stretch of a Red Sox game at Fenway Park. In a surprise appearance, he was joined by Will Swenson, who portrays Diamond in the musical A Beautiful Noise.

Retirement from touring
In January 2018, Diamond announced that he would stop touring after he was diagnosed with Parkinson's disease. Tour dates on the final leg of Diamond's "50 Year Anniversary World Tour" in Australia and New Zealand were cancelled. An announcement on his official website said he was not retiring from music and that the cancellation of the live performances would allow him to "continue his writing, recording and development of new projects."

On July 28, 2018, Diamond and his wife Katie McNeil made a surprise visit to the Incident Command post in Basalt, Colorado—near where Diamond lives—to thank the firefighters and families with a solo acoustic guitar concert for efforts in containing the Lake Christine Fire, which began on July 3 and had scorched  of land.

In popular culture
In 1967, Diamond was featured on the fourth episode of the detective drama Mannix as the 'featured' artist in a small underground club called 'The Bad Scene' and was interrupted during his singing by one of many fights that took place weekly on the show.

In 2000, Neil Diamond appeared onstage with a Diamond tribute band, Super Diamond, surprising them before their show at House of Blues in Los Angeles.

In the 2001 comedy film Saving Silverman, the main characters play in a Diamond cover band, and Diamond made an extended cameo appearance as himself. Diamond even wrote and composed a new song, "I Believe in Happy Endings", for the film. He sat in with the tribute band Super Diamond at the film's premiere party.

Personal life

Diamond has been married three times. In 1963, he married his high-school sweetheart, Jaye Posner, who had become a schoolteacher. They had two daughters. They separated in 1967 and divorced in 1969.

On December 5, 1969, Diamond married production assistant Marcia Murphey. They had two sons. The marriage lasted 25 years, ending in 1994 or 1995.

In 1996, Diamond began a relationship with Australian Rae Farley after the two met in Brisbane, Australia. The songs on Home Before Dark were written and composed during her struggle with chronic back pain.

On September 7, 2011, in a message on Twitter, the 70-year-old Diamond announced his engagement to the 41-year-old Katie McNeil. Diamond said that his 2014 album Melody Road was fueled by their relationship, explaining:
There's no better inspiration or motivation for work than being in love. It's what you dream of as a creative person. I was able to complete this album—start it, write it and complete it—under the spell of love, and I think it shows somehow.
The couple married in front of family and close friends in Los Angeles in 2012. In addition to serving as Diamond's manager, McNeil produced the documentary Neil Diamond: Hot August Nights NYC.

Discography

Filmography
Diamond had a television appearance and roles in some movies, notably:

Mannix, "The Many Deaths of Saint Christopher" (1967) as himself
The Jazz Singer, starring role as Jess Robin
 Saving Silverman appearing as himself
 Keeping Up With The Steins appearing as himself

Notes

References

External links

 
 Neil Diamond's Band's Official Site 
 
 

 
1941 births
Living people
20th-century American guitarists
20th-century American pianists
20th-century American singers
21st-century American pianists
21st-century American singers
Abraham Lincoln High School (Brooklyn) alumni
American acoustic guitarists
American baritones
American folk guitarists
American male guitarists
American male pianists
American male singer-songwriters
American pop guitarists
American pop rock singers
American rock guitarists
American rock songwriters
American soft rock musicians
American people of Polish-Jewish descent
American people of Russian-Jewish descent
Jewish American musicians
Jewish American songwriters
Jewish singers
Jewish folk singers
Jewish rock musicians
Erasmus Hall High School alumni
Capitol Records artists
Columbia Records artists
MCA Records artists
NYU Violets fencers
Uni Records artists
Golden Globe Award-winning musicians
Grammy Lifetime Achievement Award winners
Kennedy Center honorees
Rhythm guitarists
Musicians from Brooklyn
Guitarists from New York City
Singers from New York City
People with Parkinson's disease
Singer-songwriters from New York (state)